Seyyedha (also Romanized as Seyyedhā) is a village in Dorungar Rural District, Now Khandan District, Dargaz County, Razavi Khorasan Province, Iran.  At the 2006 census its population was 247 in 62 families.

References 

Populated places in Dargaz County